La Voz del Pueblo was a liberal weekly newspaper published from Bogotá, Colombia in 1849. The first issue of the newspaper was published on January 7, 1849. It came out on Sundays. The newspaper was identified with the opposition against the incumbent government. The ninth, and last, issue of La Voz del Pueblo came out on March 4, 1849.

External links
PDF archive

References

1849 establishments in the Republic of New Granada
1849 disestablishments
Newspapers published in Colombia
Spanish-language newspapers
Mass media in Bogotá